Khiriyawan village is a small village in Gaya district, Bihar, India.

Demographics 
As of the 2011 census, the population was 2,839 - 1,503 males and 1,336 are females giving a sex ratio of 889 which was lower than the state average of 918
There were 487 children 6 or younger, which was 17.15% of the village population. The literacy rate was 66.75% better than the state average of 61.80% Male literacy was 75.26% and female literacy was 57.37%. 

This village is situated in wazirganj tehsil. Wazirganj(sakardas)is the area of sirmour Rajput caste. In this village Most of the peoples also belongs to Rajput sirmour

Location 
Transport to the village is mainly by train or by bus. The nearest main railway station is Gaya, and the local railway station is Wazirgunj. The local market is 4 km away at Wazirgunj, and the main town is the city of Gaya 25 km away.

Economy 
The village is in an almost dry area. The main source of employment is agriculture.

References 

Villages in Gaya district